Nemuri-neko ( or , "sleeping cat", from nemuri, "sleeping/peaceful" and neko, "cat") is a famous wood carving by Hidari Jingorō (左甚五郎の作) located in the East corridor at Tōshō-gū Shrine (日光東照宮) in Nikkō, Japan.

The Japanese sleeping cat is modeled after the famous crouching nemurineko carving by Hidari Jingorō.
Based on the writing of Zempei Matsumura's book, Nikkō Tōshō-gū Shrine and Jingorō Hidari published by Nohi Publishing Company in 1975:

Hidari Jingorō loved cats and was fascinated by cats. Jingorō spent eight months in seclusion to refine his knowledge and technique in wood sculpturing. He spent the majority of his time studying, sculpturing, and carving wooden cats that appeared lifelike in various shapes.

According to Matsumura, it was Jingorō's goal to carve and sculpture lifelike cats by making "utmost efforts in the future to create a new style in the field of sculpturing".

Prior to his seclusion, Jingorō was an apprentice for the Chief Architect Hokyo Yoheiji Yusa of the Imperial Court in Kyoto where he studied how to build temples, shrines, and sculptures.

Through Jingorō's insight and new technique, animal sculpturing would take a new direction in Japan, a realistic appearance of an animal due to fine detailed sculpturing by the artist. Jingorō's approach in detailed wood sculpturing would later have an effect in other areas of Japanese art, namely, ceramic animals.

This creative attention to detailing sculptured cats can be seen throughout the history of Japan, and more applicably in the ceramic arts. It is the fine detailed realistic life like cats that fascinates cat collectors, and makes these special type of cats highly desirable and collectible.

Matsumura also states, Nemuri Neko "Sleeping Cat symbolizes Nikkō or the Spirit of Ieyasu, who was thought to be the manifestation of Yakushi Nyorai", the Buddha of Healing, who offers medicinal remedies, gives nourishment to the mind, body, and spirit, and comforts the sick and cures illnesses.

The nemuri neko is a National Treasure in Japan, and has been of inspiration to Japanese artists and artists around the world for centuries.

Gallery

See also

References
 Zempei Matsumura, Nikkō Tōshō-gū Shrine and Hidari Jingorō, Nohi Publishing Company, Japan, 1975.

Japanese art